The Great Adventure is the fifth album released by Christian singer Steven Curtis Chapman. The album was released on June 19, 1992 by Sparrow Records. It went Gold in just under one year, being certified.

The album was listed at No. 33 in the 2001 book, CCM Presents: The 100 Greatest Albums in Christian Music. It brought Chapman several Gospel Music Association awards at the 24th GMA Dove Awards in 1993, including Song of the Year (with Geoff Moore), Pop/Contemporary Recorded Song of the Year, and Short Form Music Video of the Year for the title song, and Pop/Contemporary Album of the Year. The album also won the 1993 Grammy Award for Best Pop/Contemporary Gospel Album.

The album features guest appearances by artists like Toby McKeehan (dc Talk), BeBe Winans, and Ricky Skaggs. Also, the song "Maria" was co-written by Chapman's wife.

Track listing
All tracks written by Steven Curtis Chapman, except where noted.
 "Prologue" (instrumental) (J.A.C. Redford) – 2:37
 "Great Adventure" (Chapman, Geoff Moore) – 4:35
 "Where We Belong" (Chapman) – 4:19
 "Go There With You" (Chapman) – 5:21
 "That's Paradise" (Chapman, Geoff Moore) – 4:59
 "Don't Let the Fire Die" (Chapman) – 4:48
 "Got to B Tru" (Chapman) (featuring TobyMac) – 4:18
 "Walk With the Wise" (Chapman, Brent Lamb) – 4:34
 "Maria" (S. Chapman, Mary Beth Chapman, James Isaac Eliott) – 5:01
 "Still Called Today" (Chapman) (featuring BeBe Winans) – 6:00
 "Heart's Cry" (Chapman, Phil Naish) – 3:11

Personnel 
 Steven Curtis Chapman – lead vocals (2-10), backing vocals (2, 3, 5-10), acoustic guitars (2-10), electric guitar (7)
 Cheryl Rogers – acoustic piano (1)
 Phil Naish – keyboards
 Jo-El Sonnier – accordion (8)
 Dann Huff – guitars
 Jerry McPherson – guitars
 Scott Sanders – dobro
 Rusty Young – lap steel guitar, additional dobro
 Jackie Street – bass 
 Paul Leim – drums
 Mark Hammond – drum programming (7, 9)
 Mark Douthit – soprano sax solo (10)
 The Nashville String Machine – orchestra (1, 4, 11)
 Carl Gorodetzky – contractor (1, 4, 11)
 J.A.C. Redford – composer, arranger and conductor (1); string and brass arrangements (4)
 Don Wyrtzen – string arrangements (11)
 Brent Lamb – backing vocals (2, 3, 10)
 Kip Raines – backing vocals (2, 3, 10)
 Trace Balin – backing vocals (5, 9)
 Chris Rodríguez – backing vocals (5, 9)
 Herb Chapman – backing vocals (7)
 Mark Heimermann – backing vocals (7)
 Toby McKeehan – rap (7)
 Lionel Cartwright – backing vocals (8)
 Ricky Skaggs – backing vocals (8)
 BeBe Winans – lead vocals (10)

Yells on "Got to B Tru"
 Chad Ballantyne, Herb Chapman, Steven Curtis Chapman, Steve Charles, Jason Cole, James Isaac Elliot, Marty Funderburk, Chris Moore, Phil Naish and Todd Robbins

Production 
 Phil Naish – producer
 Peter York – executive producer
 Ronnie Brookshire – engineer, mixing (7-11)
 Bill Deaton – mixing (1-6)
 Steve Bishir – additional engineer
 Patrick Kelly – additional engineer, assistant engineer
 Carry Summers – additional engineer
 John Kunz – assistant engineer
 Todd Robbins – assistant engineer
 Studio at Mole End (Franklin, Tennessee) – recording location, mixing location
 Nightingale Studio (Nashville, Tennessee) – track recording location
 Quad Studios (Nashville, Tennessee) – additional recording location
 OmniSound (Nashville, Tennessee) – additional recording location
 Skylab Studios (Nashville, Tennessee) – additional recording location
 Great Circle Sound (Nashville, Tennessee) – strings recording location
 Carol Bobolts for Red Herring Design – design
 Frank W. Ockenfels 3 – photography
 Helena Occhipinti – hair and make-up
 Jeffrey Tay Stylists – stylists

References

Steven Curtis Chapman albums
1992 albums
Grammy Award for Best Pop/Contemporary Gospel Album